Football is a widely practiced and popular sport in Venezuela, although the sport has lagged behind baseball in  popularity. The country has proven one of the biggest underachievers in CONMEBOL and was formerly known as the Cenicienta of the region.

History
The Federación Venezolana de Fútbol was established in 1926 following the creation of the Liga Venezolana in 1921. Professionalism was not established until 1957 with the Copa de Venezuela arriving two years later. Caracas Fútbol Club are the country's most successful club side. A second division was added in 1979 with a third added in 1999 and a fourth in 2006.

Men's professional football

International
Venezuela national football team played their first game in 1938 and since then have been one of South America's weakest teams. Following Ecuador's qualification for the 2002 FIFA World Cup, Venezuela are now the only CONMEBOL member to have never appeared at a World Cup finals. However the team are no longer seen as pushovers and are now recognised as stern opposition. Their growing status was further demonstrated by their hosting of the Copa América 2007 during which they reached the quarter finals. Furthermore, during the Copa América 2011, held in Argentina, they even improved this performance and reached the semifinals, after knocking out the Chilean team in the quarter-finals. They eventually lost in the semifinals against Paraguay.

An under-20 team, an under-17 team and a women's team also compete.

In 2017, Venezuela achieved one of its biggest ever feat in its football history, by becoming the fourth South American country after Brazil, Argentina and Uruguay, to reach the final of any FIFA competitions, when its U-20 side reached the final of 2017 FIFA U-20 World Cup for the first time. Chile would follow this step in the 2017 FIFA Confederations Cup later.

+40,000-capacity football venues in Venezuela

References

External links
 Venezuela Football Federation